Hugh Christopher Budd PhL STD (known as Christopher Budd; born 27 May 1937) is a British Roman Catholic prelate and the 8th Bishop of Plymouth.

Early life and education
Born in Romford, Essex,(now East London), United Kingdom, he was educated at St Mary's Primary School, Hornchurch and at St Ignatius College, Stamford Hill. Budd was ordained a priest in Rome on 8 July 1962 for service in the Roman Catholic Diocese of Brentwood.

Episcopal Ministry
He was appointed as Bishop of Plymouth on 19 November 1985 and received episcopal ordination on 15 January 1986.

His successor, Mark O'Toole, was appointed on 9 November 2013 by Pope Francis.

In retirement he splits his time between Lyme Regis in Dorset and Scilly Isles.

References

External links

1937 births
Living people
People from Romford
20th-century Roman Catholic bishops in England
21st-century Roman Catholic bishops in England
Roman Catholic bishops of Plymouth
English College, Rome alumni